LIM/homeobox protein Lhx6 is a protein that in humans is encoded by the LHX6 gene.

This gene encodes a member of a large protein family that contains the LIM domain, a unique cysteine-rich zinc-binding domain. The encoded protein may function as a transcriptional regulator and may be involved in the control of differentiation and development of neural and lymphoid cells. Two alternatively spliced transcript variants encoding distinct isoforms have been described for this gene. Alternatively spliced transcript variants have been identified, but their biological validity has not been determined.

References

Further reading